The Luxembourgish National Time Trial Championship is a time trial race that takes place inside the Luxembourgish National Cycling Championship, and decides the best cyclist in this type of race. The first edition took place in 1999 as a men's only competition, won by Christian Poos. Bob Jungels holds the record for the most wins in the men's championship with seven. The women's record is held by Christine Majerus with sixteen wins, including every year following the initial women's championship in 2006.

Multiple winners

Men

Elite

U23

Women

Elite

See also
Luxembourgish National Road Race Championships
National road cycling championships

Notes

References

External links
Past winners on cyclingarchives.com

National road cycling championships
Cycle races in Luxembourg
Recurring sporting events established in 1999
1999 establishments in Luxembourg